Narciso Crook (born July 12, 1995) is a Dominican professional baseball outfielder in the Boston Red Sox organization. He made his Major League Baseball (MLB) debut in 2022 with the Chicago Cubs.

Early life
Crook began playing baseball at 11 years old after moving to Trenton, New Jersey, from the Dominican Republic when his mother married former professional football player Al Darby. He played prep baseball at Trenton Central High School, from which he graduated in 2012, before moving on to Gloucester County College (since renamed as Rowan College of South Jersey).

Career

Chicago Cubs 
Crook played in Minor League Baseball for the Cincinnati Reds organization from 2014 through 2021, reaching the Triple-A level. In 2022, he joined the Chicago Cubs organization, playing 101 games with the Triple-A Iowa Cubs, where he batted .260 with 19 home runs and 67 runs batted in (RBIs).  He was first called up to the major leagues on June 30, 2022. In four games with Chicago, he batted 2-for-8 with two RBIs. He elected free agency on November 10, 2022.

Boston Red Sox 
On November 22, 2022, Crook signed a minor-league contract with the Boston Red Sox.

See also
 List of Major League Baseball players from the Dominican Republic

References

External links

1995 births
Living people
Baseball players from New Jersey
People from Nagua
Dominican Republic expatriate baseball players in the United States
Major League Baseball players from the Dominican Republic
Major League Baseball outfielders
Sportspeople from Trenton, New Jersey
Trenton Central High School alumni
Chicago Cubs players
Arizona League Reds players
Dayton Dragons players
Daytona Tortugas players
Pensacola Blue Wahoos players
Chattanooga Lookouts players
Louisville Bats players
Tigres del Licey players
Iowa Cubs players
Dominican Republic emigrants to the United States